Borja Valle Balonga (born 9 July 1992) is a Spanish professional footballer who plays as a winger for FC Cartagena.

Club career

Ponferradina
Born in Ponferrada, Castile and León, Valle was a product of local SD Ponferradina's youth system, making his senior debut with the reserves in the 2009–10 season. On 9 May 2010, he appeared in his first official match with the first team, playing the last 19 minutes of the 1–0 away loss against Zamora CF as the club was eventually promoted.

On 29 January 2011, Valle made his professional debut with Ponfe by coming on as a late substitute in a 1–0 defeat at SD Huesca in the Segunda División. His first goal in the competition came on 12 March, as he scored the 2–1 home winner over Albacete Balompié.

Spell in Galicia
On 26 January 2012, Valle was loaned to Celta de Vigo B of Segunda División B. Six months later, he joined fellow league side CD Ourense in the same situation, and signed permanently with the latter on 6 June 2013.

Oviedo
On 21 May 2014, Valle moved to Real Oviedo also in the third division. He scored a career-best nine goals during the campaign, achieving promotion to the second tier.

Deportivo
Valle signed a three-year contract with La Liga club Deportivo de La Coruña on 21 June 2016. He made his debut in the competition on 26 August, replacing Florin Andone in a 0–0 away draw against Real Betis.

On 18 January 2017, Valle was loaned to Elche CF of division two until the end of the season. Upon returning, he scored his first goal for Deportivo and in the top flight on 14 April 2018, in the 3–2 victory at Athletic Bilbao.

Romania
Valle joined FC Dinamo București on 7 September 2020, on a two-year deal. In his first match in the Romanian Liga I, he scored from approximately 60 meters in the 1–1 home draw with FC Botoșani.

Later career
On 30 December 2020, Valle returned to Oviedo on a short-term contract. The following 26 July, he moved to the Emirati UAE Pro League with Khor Fakkan Club, but returned to his homeland in the next transfer window on a five-month deal at AD Alcorcón.

On 7 July 2022, free agent Valle agreed to a one-year contract at fellow second-tier FC Cartagena.

Honours
Oviedo
Segunda División B: 2014–15

References

External links

1992 births
Living people
People from Ponferrada
Sportspeople from the Province of León
Spanish footballers
Footballers from Castile and León
Association football forwards
La Liga players
Segunda División players
Segunda División B players
Tercera División players
Divisiones Regionales de Fútbol players
SD Ponferradina B players
SD Ponferradina players
Celta de Vigo B players
CD Ourense footballers
Real Oviedo players
Deportivo de La Coruña players
Elche CF players
AD Alcorcón footballers
FC Cartagena footballers
Liga I players
FC Dinamo București players
UAE Pro League players
Khor Fakkan Sports Club players
Spanish expatriate footballers
Expatriate footballers in Romania
Expatriate footballers in the United Arab Emirates
Spanish expatriate sportspeople in Romania
Spanish expatriate sportspeople in the United Arab Emirates